Schouwia is a monotypic genus of flowering plants belonging to the family Brassicaceae. It only contains one known species, Schouwia purpurea (Forssk.) Schweinf. 

Its native range is Sahara and Sahel to the Arabian Peninsula (Palestine and Saudi Arabia). It is found in the African countries of Algeria, Burkina, Chad, Djibouti, Egypt, Ethiopia, Libya, Mali, Mauritania, Morocco, Niger, Somalia, Sudan, and Yemen.

The genus name of Schouwia is in honour of Joakim Frederik Schouw (1789–1852), a Danish lawyer, botanist and politician. From 1821, he was a professor in botany at the University of Copenhagen. The genus has 2 known synoyms; Cyclopterygium  and Subularia 
The Latin specific epithet of purpurea means purplish or purple-like.
It was first described and published in Syst. Nat. Vol.2 on page 643 in 1821. Then the species was published in Bull. Herb. Boissier Vol.4 (App. 2) on page 183 in 1896.

References

Brassicaceae
Brassicaceae genera
Plants described in 1821
Flora of North Africa
Flora of West Tropical Africa
Flora of Northeast Tropical Africa
Flora of the Arabian Peninsula
Flora of Palestine (region)